Davide Campari-Milano N.V., trading as Campari Group, is an Italian company active since 1860 in the branded beverage industry. It produces spirits, wines, and non-alcoholic apéritifs. From its signature product, Campari, its portfolio has been extended to include over 50 brands, including Aperol, Appleton, Cinzano, SKYY vodka, Espolón, Wild Turkey, Grand Marnier, and Forty Creek whisky.

Group profile 
Founded in Milan by Gaspare Campari and currently headquartered in Sesto San Giovanni, the Group is now a global company  (sixth-largest spirits group worldwide), marketing and distributing its products in over 190 countries. Production is concentrated in 22 manufacturing plants.

Campari Group employs approximately 4,000 people and has its own distribution network. The company operates in Austria, Belgium, Germany, Italy, Luxembourg, Russia, Switzerland, the UK and Ukraine in Europe; Argentina, Brazil, Jamaica, Mexico and the United States in the Americas, as well as in Australia and China. Local distributors are additionally used in over 180 other markets. Campari Group has improved its performance over the years, doubling its size since the year of its first listing on Piazza Affari, combining organic and external growth. Sales for 2012 amounted to €1,340.8 million, 76.7% of which was in spirits, 14.6% in wines, and around 8% in soft drinks.

History

The first century

Campari Group traces its beginnings back to 1860, with the birth of its flagship brand and signature, red aperitif beverage- Campari. Born in 1828, Gaspare Campari, the inventor of the recipe, was the 10th child of a farming family. At 14 he began working as a waiter and started developing a strong interest in people's drinking habits, coming to create the product that would take his name. Deciding to open his own bar, it became so successful that he opened another in the heart of Milan, making his own cordials, cream liqueurs and bitters in the basement. His choice of location near the Duomo coincided with the opening of Galleria Vittorio Emanuele, contributing to the fame of its bar and its bitters, then called Bitter all'Uso d'Olanda, which became extremely popular at the time.

In 1904 the historic production site at Sesto San Giovanni was inaugurated. It would remain in operation until 2005 when a new production site was opened in Novi Ligure.

In 1926 Davide, Gaspare's son, transformed the company by dropping the production of all drinks other than a Campari bitter and Cordial Campari. Davide dedicated his considerable energy and determination to making the brand known across the world.

In 1932 Camparisoda, the first single-serve aperitif in the world, was launched. The bottle was designed by Fortunato Depero, one of the most famous Futurist artists of the time. The iconic bottle, unchanged to this day, has become a symbol of everyday “usable” design objects in Italy and the world. According to Italy's important newsmagazine La Domenica del Corriere [The Sunday Courrier] the new object was a “genuine novelty and wonder of the season.”  Depero's invention had many highly innovative features.  It was the first single-dose product, it was ready for consumption and it contained the perfect pre-dinner drink mix of Campari and soda. The bottle's striking design resembled an upside down glass.

Davide Campari died in 1936; ten years later, the company incorporated as Davide Campari-Milano S.p.A. The company remained concentrated on this core product for most of the rest of the century, even after Domenico Garavoglia gained control of it in the 1970s.

Sales grew especially strongly during the 1960s; by then, the Campari brands were distributed in over 80 countries, and over another 30 years distribution would cover 190 countries.

1960-2022 
 
The critical step took place at the beginning of the 1990s. The rapid consolidation of the global drinks market, and especially the creation of a small number of dominant players such as Diageo and Allied Domecq, led Campari to make a choice between joining the race for market size or simply defending its core but niche product. The first step towards building a competitive portfolio on the global market came in 1995 with the acquisition of the Italian business of the Dutch Group BolsWessanen.
This brought a number of front-ranking names such as Crodino, Cynar, Lemonsoda, Oransoda, Biancosarti and Crodo.

In 1998, the group underwent a further expansion with the acquisition of a minority holding and world distribution rights (except for the USA) in Skyy Spirits LLC, owner of SKYY Vodka. Skyy Spirits, LLC became the distributor for the whole Campari portfolio in the US as part of the deal. Later in 1998 the group gained the Italian distribution rights of Lipton Ice Tea, from Unilever Group.

In 1999, expansion continued with the acquisition of Ouzo 12, the anise-based Greek spirit.  In 1999 the group also acquired Cinzano, producing vermouth and sparkling wines and one of the most internationally known Italian brands.

In July 2001, the group completed its IPO on Piazza Affari, in Italy's biggest IPO of the year. The shares were priced at the lower end of the indicative price range of 30 to 38. The initial public offering was three times oversubscribed.
The group later acquired leading brands like the Dreher aguardiente, the Old Eight, Drury's, Gregson's and Gold Cup whiskies and Liebfraumilch wine.

In 2002, Campari finalized the acquisition of Zedda Piras S.p.A. (Mirto di Sardegna), owning a majority stake in Sella & Mosca S.p.A., both companies based in Sardinia, Italy. The same focus on wine brought the group to acquire Riccadonna in 2003, producing Asti sparkling white wine.

In December 2003, Campari Group announced the acquisition of Barbero 1891 S.p.A. that brought to the portfolio brands including Aperol, Aperol Soda and Barbieri liqueurs in the spirit segment and Mondoro and Enrico Serafino in wines.

In December 2005, Campari Group acquired the Teruzzi & Puthod winery in the Tuscan town of San Gimignano. Teruzzi & Puthod is one of the leading Tuscan wineries for the production of high-quality wines sold in over 20 countries worldwide.

In 2006, Campari Group acquired from Pernod Ricard Glen Grant, Old Smuggler and Braemar, along with the distillery where Glen Grant is produced in Rothes, Scotland.  Thanks to this acquisition, the group strengthened its presence in the spirits segment and officially entered the key Scotch whisky segment.

In 2007, Campari Group announced the acquisition of Cabo Wabo tequila, created by Van Halen lead singer Sammy Hagar, adding the Tequila segment to the already wide portfolio.

In 2009, Campari Group announced the largest acquisition in its history, buying the Kentucky bourbon whiskey brand Wild Turkey. Along with Wild Turkey bourbon, American Honey liqueur, a honey and bourbon-based cordial, joined the portfolio. The group also took ownership of the distillery in Lawrenceburg, Kentucky as part of the deal.

In 2010, Campari Group announced an agreement to acquire Carolans Irish Cream, Frangelico Hazelnut Liqueur and Irish Mist Whiskey Honey Liqueur.

On July 6, 2011, Campari Group celebrated the tenth anniversary of its listing on Borsa Italiana.

In December 2012, Campari Group announced the successful acquisition of Lascelles deMercado & Co. Limited, including four brands: Appleton Estate, Appleton Special/White, Wray & Nephew and Coruba, the related upstream supply chain and the local distribution company.

In 2014, Campari Group announced the successful acquisition of Averna, Italy's second best-selling bitter, at 103.75 million euros ($143 million). The Averna group owns a portfolio of premium brands, among which are Braulio, a herb-based bitter, and Grappa Frattina, through which Campari entered the grappa category.

In March 2014, Campari Group purchased Canadian whisky producer Forty Creek Distillery Ltd. for $185.6 million (Canadian). The sale included 100% of the distillery, including all Forty Creek facilities and whisky stocks. Founder John Hall stayed on as master distiller and blender.

Campari Group's biggest acquisition to date was of Grand Marnier in 2016. In 2017, Campari acquired Bulldog London Dry Gin and then acquired French brand Bisquit Cognac in 2018.

In 2019, Campari Group purchased Rhumantilles, maker of French rums Trois Rivières and Maison La Mauny; as well as Licorera Ancho Reyes and Casa Montelobos.

Campari Group celebrated its 160th anniversary that year with the Infinito Campari installation, designed by sculptor Oliviero Rainaldi. The company also curated The Spiritheque, an editorial collection of illustrated and animated stories relaying anecdotes behind the main brands of Campari Group's product portfolio represented in a virtual art gallery.

2021 marked Campari Group's 20th anniversary on the Italian Stock Exchange. In August 2022, Campari Group acquired 15% stake in Howler Head, a flavoured bourbon brand from Catalyst Spirits. In October 2022, it was announced Campari Group had acquired a minority stake in the global spirits incubator, Catalyst Sprits, for an undisclosed sum.

Products
Campari's beverage brands include:
sarti, American Honey Liqueur, Zedda Piras
Apéritif: Campari, Aperol, Cinzano Vermouth Bianco, Cinzano Vermouth Extra Dry, Crodino, 1757 Vermouth di Torino Extra Dry, 1757 Vermouth di Torino Rosso, Campari Soda
Bourbon Whiskey: Wild Turkey, Russell's Reserve
Brazilian Whiskey: Old Eight, Drury's
Cachaça: Sagatiba
Canadian whisky: Forty Creek
Champagne: Champagne Lallier
Cognac: Bisquit Cognac, Grand Marnier
Fruit brandy: Dreher
Gin: Bankes London Dry Gin, Bulldog London Dry Gin
Liqueur: Campari, Aperol, Grand Marnier, Amaro Averna, Amaro Braulio, Ouzo 12, Irish Mist, Frangelico, Cynar, X-Rated Fusion Liqueur
Mixed drinks: Aperol Spritz, Aperol Soda, Campari Soda, Campari Mixx, Campari Orange Passion, Cinzano Soda, Cinzano Cocktail, Crodino Twist, SKYY blue
Rum: Appleton Estate, J. Wray and Nephew, Sangsters, Coruba, La Mauny, Trois Rivières
Scotch Whisky: Glen Grant, Old Smuggler
Sparkling wine: Cinzano, Mondoro, Riccadonna
Tequila: Espolon, Cabo Wabo
Uruguayan Whiskey: Gregson's
Vermouth: Cinzano, Mondoro
Vodka: SKYY vodka, Jean-Marc XO Vodka, Prince Igor Vodka
Still Wine: Liebfraumilch, Red Label, Magnum tonic

See also

 List of Italian companies

References

External links
 
 Angelo Dringoli. "Corporate Strategy and Firm Growth: Creating Value for Shareholders", 2012. (p.174-190)

 
Italian companies established in 1860
Distilleries in Italy
Food and drink companies established in 1860
Italian brands
Multinational companies headquartered in Italy
Multinational food companies
Soft drinks manufacturers